ʿAbdul Qādir Gīlānī, known by admirers as Muḥyī l-Dīn Abū Muḥammad b. Abū Sāliḥ ʿAbd al-Qādir al-Jīlānī al-Baḡdādī al-Ḥasanī al-Ḥusaynī (March 23, 1078February 21, 1166), was a Sunni Muslim preacher, ascetic, mystic, jurist, and theologian belonging to the Hanbali, and the eponymous founder of the Qadiriyya tariqa (Sufi order) of Sufism. The Qadiriyya tariqa is named after him.

He was born on March 23, 1078 (1 Ramdhan 470 AH) in the town of Na'if, Rezvanshahr in Gilan, Iran, and died on February 21, 1166 (11 Rabi' al-Thani 561 AH), in Baghdad.

Name
The honorific Muhiyudin denotes his status with many Sufis as a "reviver of religion". Gilani (Arabic al-Jilani) refers to his place of birth, Gilan. However, Gilani also carried the epithet Baghdadi, referring to his residence and burial in Baghdad.

Family background
Gilani's father, Abu Saleh, was from a Hasanid Sayyid lineage, tracing his descent from Hasan ibn Ali, a grandson of the Islamic prophet Muhammad, making him a member of Banu Hashim. Abu Saleh was respected as a Wali by the people of his day, and was known as Jangi Dost (lit. "fight-lover" in Farsi) in the Iranic-speaking world, his father's sobriquet. Gilani's mother, Ummul Khair Fatima, was also a Sayyid, but of the Husaynid branch having been a descendant of Muhammad al-Jawad, who was said to be descended from Husayn ibn Ali, the younger brother of Hasan.

Education
Gilani spent his early life in Gilan, the province of his birth. In 1095, he went to Baghdad. There, he pursued the study of Hanbali law under Abu Saeed Mubarak Makhzoomi and ibn Aqil. He studied Hadith with Abu Muhammad Ja'far al-Sarraj. His Sufi spiritual instructor was Abu'l-Khair Hammad ibn Muslim al-Dabbas. After completing his education, Gilani left Baghdad. He spent twenty-five years wandering in the deserts of Iraq.

School of law 
Gilani belonged to the Shafi'i and Hanbali schools of law. He placed Shafi'i jurisprudence (fiqh) on an equal footing with the Hanbali school (madhhab), and used to give fatwa according to both of them simultaneously. This is why al-Nawawi praised him in his book entitled Bustan al-'Arifin (Garden of the Spiritual Masters), saying: "We have never known anyone more dignified than Baghdad's Sheikh Muhyi al-Din 'Abd al-Qadir al-Jilani, may Allah be pleased with him, the Sheikh of Shafi'is and Hanbalis in Baghdad".

Later life
In 1127, Gilani returned to Baghdad and began to preach to the public. He joined the teaching staff of the school belonging to his teacher, al-Mazkhzoomi, and was popular with students. In the morning he taught hadith and tafsir, and in the afternoon he discoursed on the science of the heart and the virtues of the Quran. He was said to have been a convincing preacher and converted numerous Jews and Christians. He was able to reconcile the mystical nature of Sufism with the sober demands of Islamic Law.

Death and burial

Gilani died on February 21, 1166 (11 Rabi' al-Thani 561 AH). His body was entombed in a shrine within his madrasa in Babul-Sheikh, Rusafa on the east bank of the Tigris in Baghdad, Iraq.

During the reign of the Safavid Shah Ismail I, Gilani's shrine was destroyed. However, in 1535, the Ottoman Sultan Suleiman the Magnificent had a dome built over the shrine, which still exists.

Birthday and death anniversary celebration
11 Rabi' al-Thani is celebrated as Gilani's death anniversary. Some scholars give 29 Sha'ban and 17 Rabi' al-Thani as his birth and death days respectively. In the Indian subcontinent, his 'urs, or death anniversary, is called Giyarwee Sharif, or Honoured Day.

Books
 Kitab Sirr al-Asrar wa Mazhar al-Anwar (The Book of the Secret of Secrets and the Manifestation of Light)
 Futuh al ghaib (Secrets of the unseen)
Ghunyat tut talibeen (Treasure for seekers)  غنیہ الطالیبین
Al-Fuyudat al-Rabbaniya (Emanations of Lordly Grace)
Fifteen Letters: Khamsata 'Ashara Maktuban
Kibriyat e Ahmar
A Concise Description of Jannah & Jahannam
The Sublime Revelation (al-Fatḥ Ar-rabbānī)

See also
 Jilala
 Moinuddin Chishti

Bibliography
 Sayings of Shaikh Abd al-Qadir al-Jīlānī Malfūzāt, Holland, Muhtar (translator). S. Abdul Majeed & Co, Kuala Lumpur (1994) .
 Fifteen letters, khamsata ashara maktūban / Shaikh Abd Al-Qādir Al-Jīlānī. Translated from Persian to Arabic by Alī usāmu D-Dīn Al-Muttaqī. Translated from Arabic into English by Muhtar Holland.
 Kamsata ašara maktūban. First edition. ʿAlāʾ al-Dīn, ʿAlī B., ʿAbd al-Malik al- Muttaqī al-Hindī (about 1480–1567) and Muhtar Holland (1935–). Al-Baz publications, Hollywood, Florida. (1997) .
 Jalā Al-Khawātir: a collection of forty-five discourses of Shaikh Abd Al-Qādir Al-Jīlānī, the removal of cares. Chapter 23, pg 308. Jalā al-Khawātir, Holland, Muhtar (1935–) (translator). Al-Baz publications, Fort Lauderdale, Florida. (1997) .
 The sultan of the saints: mystical life and teachings of Shaikh Syed Abdul Qadir Jilani / Muhammad Riaz Qadiri Qadiri, Muhammad Riyaz. Gujranwala, Abbasi publications. (2000) .
 The sublime revelation: al-Fath ar-Rabbānī, a collection of sixty-two discourses / Abd al-Qādir al- Jīlānī, Second edition. al-Rabbānī, al-Fath. Al-Baz publications, Fort Lauderdale, Florida. (1998). .
 Al-Ghunya li-talibi tariq al-haqq wa al-din, (Sufficient provision for seekers of the path of truth and religion), Parts one and two in Arabic. Al-Qadir, Abd, Al-Gaylani. Dar Al-Hurya, Baghdad, Iraq, (1988).
 Al-Ghunya li-talibi tariq al-haqq wa al-din,  (Sufficient provision for seekers of the path of truth and religion.) in Arabic. Introduced by Al-Kilani, Majid Irsan. Dar Al-Khair, Damascus, Bairut, (2005).
 Encyclopædia Iranica'', Bibliotheca Persica PresS, .
Geography of the Baz Ahhab second reading in the biography of Sheikh Abdul Qadir Gilani, and the birthplace of his birth according to the methodology of scientific research (MA in Islamic History from Baghdad University in 2001) of Iraqi researcher Jamal al-Din Faleh Kilani, review and submission of the historian Emad Abdulsalam Rauf،Publishe Dar Baz Publishing, United States of America, 2016, translated by Sayed Wahid Al-Qadri Aref.

References

External links

 الباز الأشهب – قراءة ثانية  في سيرة الشيخ  عبد القادر الكيلاني – جمال الدين الكيلاني GOGHRAFI ALBAZ ALASHB  
 Revelations of the Unseen Translation of Futuh al-Ghaib, at archive.org.
 Sufficient Provision For Seekers Of The Path Of Truth Translation of parts of Al-Ghunya Li Talibi Tariq Al-Haqq, at archive.org.
 Openings from the Lord Translation of excerpts from Al-Fath Al-Rabbani, at archive.org.
 Utterances Translation of Malfuzat, at archive.org.

Iranian Sunni Muslims
Iranian religious leaders
Iranian Sufi religious leaders
12th-century Muslim scholars of Islam
Hanbalis
Hashemite people
1078 births
1166 deaths
Iranian emigrants to Iraq
People from Gilan Province
People from Amol
11th-century Iranian people
12th-century Iranian people
Hasanids
Iranian Sufi saints
12th-century jurists
Founders of Sufi orders
Iranian Muslim mystics